The Balan River is a transboundary river starting from Sivalik Hills of Nepal and crossing to India at Laxmipur. It is a plains-fed system. The length of the river is about 200 km (120 mi). It then merges with the Kamala River and finally outflows to the Kosi River.

See also
List of rivers of Nepal

References

Rivers of Nepal
Transborder rivers